"Before" is a song by English synth-pop duo Pet Shop Boys, released on 22 April 1996 as the lead single from their sixth studio album, Bilingual (1996). Upon its release, the single peaked at number seven on the UK Singles Chart, number four in Finland, and number one in Hungary. In the United States, it topped the Billboard Hot Dance Club Play chart.

Critical reception
Larry Flick from Billboard described the song as "a tasteful blend of electro-pop and retro-disco", and an "vigorous and appealing house shuffler". He also noted that it "rides the act's familiar flair for clever lyrics and smooth melodies". James Hamilton from Music Weeks RM Dance Update noted its "gentle cooing".

Music video
The accompanying music video for "Before" was directed by Howard Greenhalgh.

Track listings

 UK CD1 and Australian CD single "Before" – 4:05
 "The Truck-Driver and His Mate" – 3:33
 "Hit and Miss" – 4:05
 "In the Night 1995" – 4:17

 UK CD2 "Before" (Classic Paradise mix) – 7:56
 "Before" (Aphrodisiac mix) – 7:27
 "Before" (Hed Boys mix) – 7:33
 "Before" (extended mix) – 8:47
 "Before" (Danny Tenaglia mix) – 7:17

 UK and Australian cassette single; European CD single "Before" – 4:05
 "The Truck Driver and His Mate" – 3:33

 UK 3×12-inch singleA1. "Before" (Underground mix) – 7:17
A2. "Before" (bonus dub) – 4:03
B1. "Before" (Underground instrumental) – 7:17
B2. "Before" (bonus beats) – 4:03
C1. "Before" (Classic Paradise mix) – 7:56
D1. "Before" (Aphrodisiac mix) – 7:27
E1. "Before" (Hed Boys mix) – 7:33
E2. "Before" (Hed Boys dub) – 4:55
F1. "Before" (Joey Negro extended mix) – 8:47

 US CD single "Before" (album version) – 4:05
 "The Truck-Driver and His Mate" – 3:33
 "Hit and Miss" – 4:05
 "Before" (video)

 US maxi-CD single "Before" (album version) – 4:05
 "Before" (D.T.'s After mix) – 8:46
 "Before" (Classic Paradise mix—Love to Infinity) – 7:56
 "Before" (Joey Negro's Hed Boys mix) – 7:35
 "Before" (Joey Negro's Before dub) – 4:55
 "Before" (Tenaglia's Underground mix) – 7:17
 "Before" (Tenaglia's bonus beats) – 4:03
 "Before" (D.T.'s Twilo dub) – 8:57
 "Before" (Tenaglia's Bonus dub) – 4:03

 US 2×12-inch singleA1. "Before" (D.T.'s After mix) – 8:46
A2. "Before" (Tenaglia's Bonus dub) – 4:03
B1. "Before" (Classic Paradise mix—Love to Infinity) – 7:56
B2. "Before" (Tenaglia's bonus beats) – 4:03
C1. "Before" (Joey Negro's Hed Boys mix) – 7:35
C2. "Before" (Joey Negro's Before dub) – 4:55
D1. "Before" (Tenaglia's Underground mix) – 7:17
D2. "Before" (D.T.'s Twilo dub) – 8:57

 US cassette single'
 "Before" (album version) – 4:05
 "The Truck-Driver and His Mate" – 3:33
 "Hit and Miss" – 4:05

Charts

Weekly charts

Year-end charts

Release history

References

1996 singles
1996 songs
Atlantic Records singles
House music songs
Music videos directed by Howard Greenhalgh
Number-one singles in Hungary
Parlophone singles
Pet Shop Boys songs
Songs written by Chris Lowe
Songs written by Neil Tennant